Centerville is an unincorporated community in Prospect Township, Marion County, Ohio, United States.

History
Centerville was originally laid out by George Clay in 1863 along the New York, Pennsylvania and Ohio Railroad.  As of 1883, the community contained one grocery store, one sawmill, a grain warehouse, a schoolhouse, a railroad station/post office, and about 12 homes.

References

Unincorporated communities in Marion County, Ohio